Sankyo Flute Manufacturing Co., Ltd, located in Sayama, Japan, produces handmade flutes, piccolos and head joints at the professional level. A number of prominent flautists, such as Walter Auer of the Vienna Philharmonic Orchestra, Julien Beaudiment of the Los Angeles Philharmonic Orchestra, John Curran of the Rhode Island Philharmonic Orchestra, and Young-ji Song of the Seoul Philharmonic Orchestra, play Sankyo flutes. (see website)

The Sankyo flute facility produces approximately 350 handmade silver, gold and wood instruments and many silver and gold headjoints every month for worldwide distribution. Sankyo Flutes are currently distributed in America through Sankyo Flutes US, a division of Flute Authority™.

Flutes

Silver Flutes
CF201 silver flute
CF301 silver flute
CF401 silver flute
CF501 silver flute
CF601 silver flute
CF701 silver flute
CF801 silver flute
CF901 silver flute

Gold Flutes
K5-4 DT 5-karat gold flute (no longer in production)
K10-2 DT 10-karat gold flute
K14-3 DT 14-karat gold flute 
K14-3 ST 14-karat gold flute 
K14-4 DT 14-karat gold flute
K14-4 ST 14-karat gold flute
K14-5 DT 14-karat gold flute
K14-5 ST 14-karat gold flute
K18-3 DT 18-karat gold flute
K18-3 ST 18-karat gold flute
K18-4 DT 18-karat gold flute
K18-4 ST 18-karat gold flute
K18-5 DT 18-karat gold flute
K18-5 ST 18-karat gold flute
K24 - 24-karat gold flute (with 14K or 18K mechanism)

Other Flutes
Wood Flute
Flûte d'amour
Alto Flutes

External links
 Sankyo Flutes Website

Musical instrument manufacturing companies of Japan
Companies based in Saitama Prefecture
Flute makers
Japanese brands